On Fire is the second studio album by American pop rock band The Higher, released through Epitaph Records on March 6, 2007.

The album's first single was the "Insurance?", followed by the second "Dare".

Track listing 
Insurance? 
Guts
Rock My Body
Weapons Wired
Histrionics
Movement
Carly (Can Anyone Really Love Young)
Darkpop
Dare 
31 Floors
Our Movie Rules 
Pace Yourself (Patrick Stump remix)

(An unnamed bonus track) begins at 4:20 in track 12

References

2007 albums
The Higher albums
Epitaph Records albums